Creatonotos gangis is a species of arctiine moth in South East Asia and Australia. It was described by Carl Linnaeus in his 1763 Centuria Insectorum.

Description and life cycle
Adults have white hindwings and brown forewings, each with a dark streak, and a wingspan of 4 cm. The abdomen is red or, more rarely, yellow. Males have four large, grey-colored coremata behind them, which can exceed the length of the abdomen when inflated.

The eggs are yellow and round, and are laid in rows on the leaves of food plants. The caterpillars are brown hairy animals with a yellow stripe along the back, with a polyphagous diet, known as a minor pest which feeds on groundnuts, rice, ragi, sorghum, Pennisetum americanum, coffee, sweet potato, and lucerne crops.

In, The Fauna of British India, Including Ceylon and Burma: Moths Volume I, the species is described as follows:

Distribution
Creatonotos gangis lives in South East Asia and parts of Australia. Its Asian distribution includes eastern Indonesia, India, Iran, Sri Lanka, China, Japan, Thailand and New Guinea. In Australia, it is restricted to northern parts of Western Australia, Northern Territory and Queensland, extending as far south as Mackay.

Ecology
Adult males secrete the pheromone hydroxydanaidal in order to attract mates. The amount produced, and the size of the coremata which produce it, are however dependent on the diet that the moth experienced as a caterpillar. If the larval diet contained pyrrolizidine alkaloids, then the coremata become large and the male will release up to 400 micrograms (0.4 milligrams) of Hydroxydanaidal, but if it does not, then the coremata do not grow large and no scent is produced.

The larvae of C. gangis can cause extensive damage to the foliage of pomegranate trees.

See also
Pyrrolizidine alkaloid sequestration

References

Further reading

Spilosomina
Moths of Australia
Moths of Asia
Moths described in 1763
Moths of Japan
Taxa named by Carl Linnaeus
Insect pests of millets